Eddie L. Armstrong III (born in North Little Rock, Arkansas) is an American politician and a Democratic member of the Arkansas House of Representatives representing District 37 since January 14, 2013. He was the House Minority Leader from 2015 to 2017, when he was succeeded by David Whitaker.

As minority leader, he worked opposite Republican then Majority Leader Ken Bragg of Grant County. In 2010, he was active in the failed reelection bid waged by Democrat Blanche Lincoln for the United States Senate. Lincoln lost to Republican John Boozman.

Education
Armstrong earned his Bachelor of Arts in Political Science from the University of Arkansas at Fayetteville.

Elections
2012 When District 37 Representative Kathy Webb left the Legislature and left the seat open, Armstrong won the three-way May 22, 2012 Democratic Primary with 964 votes (58.4%), and was unopposed for the November 6, 2012 General election.

References

External links
Official page at the Arkansas House of Representatives

Eddie Armstrong III at Ballotpedia
Eddie Armstrong III at the National Institute on Money in State Politics

Year of birth missing (living people)
Living people
African-American state legislators in Arkansas
Democratic Party members of the Arkansas House of Representatives
Politicians from North Little Rock, Arkansas
University of Arkansas alumni
21st-century American politicians
21st-century African-American politicians